Roy Edward Johnson (June 27, 1959 – January 26, 2009) was an American professional baseball outfielder who appeared in 36 games in Major League Baseball (MLB), mainly as a center fielder, in parts of three seasons for the Montreal Expos (–). He was selected by the Expos in the fifth round of the 1980 Major League Baseball Draft out of Tennessee State University.

Johnson was a distinguished hitter in the minors, but he was not able to translate it to major league success. He posted a .171 batting average (12-for-70) with four doubles, one home run (a two-run shot off Rich Bordi of the Chicago Cubs on September 12, 1984) and four runs batted in in 79 MLB plate appearances.

In his eight-season minor league career, Johnson hit .291 with 85 homers and 428 RBI in 773 games, including an .829 on-base plus slugging percentage. He hit .361 with 90 RBI and a .561 slugging percentage at Triple-A for the 1982 Wichita Aeros, where he also played in 1983. Dealt to the Oakland Athletics, he was a member of the Triple-A Tacoma Tigers during three seasons (1986–1988), hitting .343 in 1986. He also played for the Piratas de Campeche of the Mexican League and later became their hitting coach.

Johnson died at his San Francisco de Campeche home of a heart attack at the age of 49. He was buried at Jardines del Angel Cemetery, in Campeche. After his death, the Piratas retired Johnson's 39 number.

Facts
Johnson is regarded as one of the most powerful foreign-born hitters to play in Mexican baseball. Called the "Arkansas Train," he shares the Mexican League record for most home runs in one game with four, and has the Campeche home run record as well (114).
The 1982 Expos had Andre Dawson, Tim Raines and Warren Cromartie as regulars in the outfield, with Terry Francona and Johnson serving in backup roles.

References

External links

1959 births
2009 deaths
African-American baseball coaches
African-American baseball players
Alacranes de Campeche players
American expatriate baseball players in Canada
American expatriate baseball players in Mexico
Baseball coaches from Arkansas
Baseball players from Arkansas
Huntsville Stars players
Indianapolis Indians players
Jacksonville Expos players
Jamestown Expos players
Major League Baseball outfielders
Memphis Chicks players
Montreal Expos players
People from Parkin, Arkansas
Pericos de Puebla players
Piratas de Campeche players
Tacoma Tigers players
Tennessee State Tigers baseball players
West Palm Beach Expos players
Wichita Aeros players
20th-century African-American sportspeople
21st-century African-American people